Sir Richard Empson (c. 1450 – 17 August 1510), minister of Henry VII, was a son of Peter Empson. Educated as a lawyer, he soon attained considerable success in his profession, and in 1491 was a Knight of the shire for Northamptonshire in Parliament, and Speaker of the House of Commons.

Career
Richard Empson, born about 1450, was the son of Peter Empson (d. 1473) and Elizabeth (Joseph) Empson. John Stow claimed that his father was a sieve maker, but there is no evidence of this. His father, Peter Empson, held property at Towcester and Easton Neston in Northamptonshire.

Early in the reign of Henry VII he became associated with Edmund Dudley in carrying out the King's rigorous and arbitrary system of taxation, and in consequence he became very unpopular. Retaining the royal favour, however, he was knighted at the creation of the future Henry VIII as Prince of Wales on 18 February 1504, and was soon High Steward of the University of Cambridge, and Chancellor of the Duchy of Lancaster, but his official career ended with Henry VII's death in April 1509.

Thrown into prison by order of the new King, Henry VIII, he was charged, like Dudley, with the crime of constructive treason, and was convicted at Northampton in October 1509. His attainder by Parliament followed, and he was beheaded on 17 August 1510. In 1512, his elder son, Thomas, was "restored in blood", meaning that his father's attainder was reversed so far as it affected him, by Act of Parliament.

Marriage and issue
Empson married Lady Jane R. Empson
, by whom he had 10 children, including:

Thomas Empson, eldest son and heir, who married Audrey or Etheldreda, one of the daughters of Sir Guy Wolston.
John Empson, who married Agnes Lovell, daughter of Henry Lovell and Constance Hussey, and a ward of Edmund Dudley.
Elizabeth Empson, who married firstly George Catesby, son of William Catesby, counsellor to Richard III, and secondly, in August 1509, Thomas Lucy, with grandson, Sir Thomas Lucy.
Joan Empson, who married firstly Henry Sothill, esquire, of Stoke Faston, Leicestershire, Attorney General to Henry VII, by whom she had twin daughters, Joan Sothill (b. 1505), who married Sir John Constable (son of Sir Marmaduke Constable), and Elizabeth Sothill, (1505–1575) who married Sir William Drury, M.P., P.C., (c.1500–1558), a son of Sir Richard Empson's successor as Speaker of the House of Commons, Sir Robert Drury of Hawstead, Suffolk. She married secondly Sir William Pierrepont of Holme Pierrepont, Nottinghamshire.
Anne Empson, who married firstly Robert Ingleton (d.1503), a ward of her father, by whom she had a daughter who married Humphrey Tyrrell. She married secondly John Higford, who in 1504 was pardoned for her rape as well as burglary, and other offences.
Mary Empson, who married Edward Bulstrode, son of Richard Bulstrode.

Notes

References

 
 

"The Visitation of Warwickshire 1619", London, 1877, p. 284.
"The Extinct & Dormant Baronetcies of England, Ireland, and Scotland" by Messrs,John and John Bernard Burke, 2nd edition, London, 1841, p. 498.
"History of Henry VII", by Francis Bacon, edited by Joseph Rawson Lumby (Cambridge, 1881).
"The Reign of Henry VIII" by J.S.Brewer, edited by James Gairdner (London, 1884).
"The Knights of England" by William A. Shaw, Litt.D.,&c., London, 1906, volume II, p. 34.
"Plantagenet Ancestry" by Douglas Richardson, Baltimore, Md., 2004, p. 276. Extremely well sourced.
"Magna Carta Ancestry" by Douglas Richardson, Baltimore, Md., 2005, p. 668.

Attribution
 

1450s births
1510 deaths
Year of birth uncertain
Chancellors of the Duchy of Lancaster
Speakers of the House of Commons of England
People executed under the Tudors for treason against England
Executed English people
English MPs 1491
People from Towcester
16th-century English people
People executed by Tudor England by decapitation
People executed under Henry VIII
Executed politicians
Burials at the Church of St Peter ad Vincula
English politicians convicted of crimes
English knights
Knights Bachelor